Eduard Harkort, also known as Edward Harcourt (July 18, 1797 – August 11, 1836) was a German-born mining engineer who served as a colonel in the Texian Army during the Texas Revolution.

References

1797 births
1836 deaths
German emigrants to Mexico
People of the Texas Revolution